The African Who Wanted to Fly is a 2016 Gabonese film directed by Samantha Biffot. It is partly based on the biography of Luc Bendza. The film was made in two languages, Chinese and French, and had English subtitles.

Production 
The African Who Wanted to Fly was produced by Neon Rouge, with co-production from The Actors Company Theatre (France). Scenese were shot in both Gabon, and China. The music was composed of Chinese tunes.

Plot 
Watching the movie Big Boss, a Gabonese child discovers Kung Fu and decides to go to China being only 15 years old. He discovers he would be the first African to learn the art of Kung Fu. He eventually masters it.

Screenings 
 The movie was viewed at the African Film Festival at Duke University on February 27, 2019.
 Maysles Documentary Center presented the film for the 24th New York African Film Festival on May 19, 2017.

References 

Documentary films about sportspeople
2016 documentary films
2010s French-language films
Films set in Gabon
Gabonese documentary films
2016 directorial debut films
Films set in China
2016 films